The 2012 Primera División del Fútbol Profesional Chileno season (known as the 2012 Campeonato Nacional Petrobras for sponsorship reasons) is the 81st season of top-flight football in Chile. Universidad de Chile is the defending champion. Universidad de Chile won both the Apertura and the Clausura Championships

Format changes
For the 2012, the ANFP's Council of Club Presidents approved the return to the Apertura and Clausura format, with playoffs.

Teams
Eighteen teams will be competing in the Primera División for the 2012 season, sixteen of whom are returning from the 2011 season. Santiago Morning and Ñublense were relegated last season after finishing 17th and 18th overall, respectively. There were replaced by Antofagasta and Rangers, the 2011 Primera B winner and runner-up, respectively.

Torneo Apertura

The Torneo Apertura began in January and will end on July 2.

Classification stage
The Classification Stage began in January and ended in July.

Standings

Results

Playoff stage

Top goalscorers

Torneo Clausura

The Torneo Clausura began in July and will end in December.

Classification stage

Standings

Results

Playoff stage

Aggregate table

Relegation/promotion playoffs

Everton won 4–3 on aggregate and is promoted to Primera División. Universidad de Concepción is relegated to Primera B.

Cobresal won 4–3 on aggregate and remains in Primera División. Barnechea remains in Primera B.

References

External links
ANFP 
2012 Chilean Primera División season at Soccerway
Season regulations 

 
Primera División de Chile seasons
Chile
1